The Council of Ministers is the executive branch that constitutes the Government of Albania. The Council is led by the Prime Minister of Albania. The prime minister is nominated by the President from among those candidates, who enjoy majority support in the Parliament; the candidate is then chosen by the Parliament. In the absence of the prime minister, the Deputy Prime Minister takes over his functions. There are 19 other government members, serving as deputy prime ministers, government ministers or both; they are chosen by the prime minister and confirmed by the Parliament.

As of April 2017, after a reshuffle, 50% of the cabinet ministers are women. The Parliament of Albania must give final approval of the composition of the cabinet. The Cabinet is responsible for carrying out both foreign and domestic policies. It directs and controls the activities of the ministries and other state bodies.

Overview

Rank
Council members are subdivided into three substantial ranks, along with one honorary rank:
Prime Minister,
Deputy Prime Minister,
Ministers, which are the highest-ranking members of the Government
Deputy Ministers, that assist ministers in specialized areas of their portfolio and
General Secretaries (Sekretari i Përgjithshëm) that assist ministers in less important areas and occasionally attend sessions of the Council of Ministers.

Role
The Council is responsible to the Parliament of Albania. The Parliament may choose to pass a motion of censure forcing the Council of Ministers to resign. This has the effect of forcing the Government to be composed of members from the majority political party in the Assembly or to be allied to the majority in a coalition. Ministers are required to answer written or oral questions put to them by members of Parliament, known as Government questions. In addition, ministers attend sessions of the Parliament when laws concerning their assigned sectors and departmental portfolios are under consideration.

Cabinet ministers cannot propose legislation without parliamentary approval. Ministers can however propose bills to Parliament and any such legislation is generally very likely to pass. On occasion, the majority opinion in Parliament may differ significantly from those of the executive, resulting in a large number of riders.

The Cabinet plays a major role in determining the agenda of the Parliament. It can propose laws and amendments during parliamentary sessions. It also has a number of procedures at its disposal to expedite parliamentary deliberations.

History
With the unilateral declaration of Albania's Independence on 28 November 1912 by the Ottoman Empire, one of the first governing bodies to emerge from the All-Albanian Congress was the formation of the Provisional Government and the Council of Ministers as the highest executive body in the country. However, the government did not last long due to its non-recognition by some of the Great Powers of the time. On 29 July 1913, Austria-Hungary, France, Great Britain, and Italy, together with Greece and Romania as interested parties, agreed to adopt the Organic Statute of Albania which would serve as the first constitution of the new state created. The statute sanctioned since in the 1st Article that Albania was a constitutional, sovereign, and hereditary Principality under the guarantee of the six Great Powers. Its formal adoption took place in Vlorë on 14 January 1914. On 22 January 1914, Ismail Qemali, one of the founders of the Albanian state and head of the Provisional Government, was forced to resign and hand it over to the International Control Commission which would serve as the highest executive body until the appointment of the monarch from the Great Powers and his arrival in Albania.

The Statute in Chapter V entitled § Government Bodies sanctioned the central government institutions, as well as their competencies and duties. Article 72 states: The Albanian Government consists of a Council of Ministers headed by a Prime Minister. While in the next article it described the composition of the council, where there are a total of 4 ministries, which are: the Ministry of Foreign Affairs, the Ministry of Internal Affairs, the Ministry of Finances and the Ministry of Justice, while the Prime Minister simultaneously exercised also the role of Minister of Foreign Affairs. The PM, as well as all ministers were appointed by the Prince, whose oath before taking office should be taken, as well as the handover of office after resignation. Although the statute sanctioned only 4 ministries, in the first government appointed by Prince Wilhelm, there were more departments than anticipated.

Incumbent Government

Governments of Albania (1912–present)

See also 
 Politics of Albania
 Prime Minister of Albania

Notes

References 

Government of Albania
Albania
Lists of government ministers